Bhatkal railway station is a railway station in coastal Karnataka in South India. Its four-letter code is BTJL.

Background
Konkan Railway Academy(KRA) is situated here providing training to entire konkan railway employees.

Infrastructure
This station has two platforms and four tracks.

Lines
There is a single diesel  broad gaugetrack.

Location
It lies off the Kanyakumari–Panvel Road, in Bhatkal, PIN Code 581320. The Mangalore Bajpe Airport (Code: IXE) is 125 km away. The station is located at an elevation of 15 metres above sea level. It lies within the KR/Konkan Zone under the Karwar Division.

Other stations
It falls under Karwar railway division of Konkan Railway zone, a subsidiary zone of Indian Railways.
under the jurisdiction of Konkan Railway.  Bhatkal has 3 stations viz Bhatkal, Chitrapur Halt, Murdeshwar

References

External links

Railway stations in Uttara Kannada district
Railway stations along Konkan Railway line
Railway stations opened in 1997
Karwar railway division